Rosen Raychev (born 9 March 1967) is a Bulgarian former equestrian. He competed at the 2000 Summer Olympics and the 2004 Summer Olympics.

References

External links
 

1967 births
Living people
Bulgarian male equestrians
Olympic equestrians of Bulgaria
Equestrians at the 2000 Summer Olympics
Equestrians at the 2004 Summer Olympics
People from Dimitrovgrad, Bulgaria
Sportspeople from Haskovo Province
21st-century Bulgarian people